John Hardee (December 20, 1918 – May 18, 1984) was an American jazz tenor saxophonist.

Hardee toured with Don Albert in 1937–38 while he was in college; he graduated in 1941. He directed a Texas school band and served in the Army during World War II. In 1946 he played with Tiny Grimes and then recorded as a bandleader for Blue Note Records between 1946 and 1948, issuing eight releases. In the 1940s and early 1950s he played with Clyde Bernhardt, Cousin Joe, Russell Procope, Earl Bostic, Billy Kyle, Helen Humes, Billy Taylor, and Lucky Millinder. In the 1950s he retired from music and became a schoolteacher. In 1959, he played saxophone on Dallas R&B group The Nightcaps (Texas band) LP Wine, Wine, Wine. He was credited as "Jon Hardtimes" and, although he performed with them occasionally, was not an official member of the group.

Discography
Leader
 John Hardee Swingtet & Sextet: Various Artists – The Blue Note Swingtets (Blue Note, 1946) with Tiny Grimes, Gene Ramey and Sid Catlett
 John Hardy Quartet & Quintet: The Tenor Sax Album – The Savoy Sessions (Savoy Records)
 Tired
 John Hardee 1946–1948
 Hardee’s Partee
 The Forgotten Texas Tenor
 Tenor Sax (Blue Note, 1946)
 Al Haig, Coleman Hawkins, Wardell Gray, John Hardee: Al Haig Meets The Master Saxes, Volume One (Spotlite Records, 1977)
 A Little Blue (Black And Blue, 1999)

Sideman
 Tiny Grimes: The Complete 1944-1950, Vol. 1 & 2 (Blue Moon)
 John Hardee mit Russell Procope Big Six & Billy Kyle’s Big Eight: Giants Of Small-Band Swing, Vol.1 (OJC, 1946)
 Helen Humes: 1945–1947 (Classics)
 Billy Kyle: 1937–1938 (Classics)

References
Scott Yanow, [ John Hardee] at Allmusic

American jazz saxophonists
American male saxophonists
1984 deaths
1918 births
20th-century American saxophonists
Jazz musicians from Texas
20th-century American male musicians
American male jazz musicians
Savoy Records artists
Black & Blue Records artists